Malice murder is a criminal offense in the U.S. state of Georgia, committed when a homicide is done with express or implied malice.

Definition
According to Georgia law, express malice is "that deliberate intention unlawfully to take the life of another human being which is manifested by external circumstances capable of proof."  Malice is implied when "no considerable provocation appears and where all the circumstances of the killing show an abandoned and malignant heart [AMH]." The offense is similar to first-degree murder in other states.

Notable examples
 Kelly Gissendaner was found guilty of malice murder in 1998 and executed in 2015.
Members of the FEAR terrorist group were charged with malice murder in 2012. 
Alberto Martinez was convicted of malice murder in 2004 in the murder of Richard T. Davis.
Stephen Anthony Mobley was convicted of both malice murder and felony murder. He was executed in 2005.
 Justin Ross Harris of Marietta, Georgia, was convicted in November 2016 of malice murder and felony murder in the June 2014 death of his 22-month-old son, Cooper. In June 2022, his murder convictions were overturned.
 Robert Aaron Long pleaded guilty to four counts of malice murder and felony murder in four of the deaths in the 2021 Atlanta spa shootings, and is facing four more counts of malice murder and felony murder in the other four deaths.
 Travis McMichael of Brunswick, Georgia, was convicted in November 2021 of malice murder in the February 2020 murder of Ahmaud Arbery.
 In early February 2021, rapper Silentó was arrested on charges of malice murder and felony murder.
 Tiffany Nicole Moss was convicted in 2019 of malice murder in the 2012 murder of her 10-year old step-daughter, Emani Moss. Tiffany was subsequently sentenced to death.

References

Killings by type
Georgia (U.S. state) law